Lauharulla is a spider genus of the jumping spider family, Salticidae.

Species
 Lauharulla insulana Simon, 1901 (Tahiti)
 Lauharulla pretiosa Keyserling, 1883 (New South Wales)

References 

Salticidae
Salticidae genera
Spiders of Oceania
Taxa named by Eugen von Keyserling